The 1961 Senior League World Series (then known as the "Senior Division Tournament") took place from August 22–25 in Williamsport, Pennsylvania, United States at Bowman Field. Natrona Heights, Pennsylvania defeated Sylva, North Carolina in the championship game.

This was the inaugural SLWS.

Teams

Results

References

Senior League World Series
Senior League World Series
Baseball in Pennsylvania